The Monción Dam is an earth-fill embankment dam on the Mao River near Monción in Santiago Rodríguez Province of the Dominican Republic. The purpose of the dam is to produce hydroelectric power and supply water for irrigation. The dam's power station is located downstream and contains two 26 MW Francis turbine-generators for an installed capacity of 52 MW. The dam was completed and began filling its reservoir on 22 September 2001. Its power station was commissioned on 27 April 2002.

See also

List of dams and reservoirs in Dominican Republic

References

Dams in the Dominican Republic
Hydroelectric power stations in the Dominican Republic
Dams completed in 2001
Energy infrastructure completed in 2002
Earth-filled dams
Santiago Rodríguez Province
2002 establishments in the Dominican Republic